83rd may refer to:

83rd Academy Awards, a ceremony that honored the best films of 2010 in the United States and took place on February 27, 2011 
83rd Grey Cup, the 1995 Canadian Football League championship game
83rd meridian east, a line of longitude 83° east of Greenwich
83rd meridian west, a line of longitude 83° west of Greenwich
83rd parallel north, a circle of latitude that is 83° north of the Earth's equatorial plane, in the Arctic
83rd Street (disambiguation)

Military units
 83rd Division (disambiguation), several units
 83rd Regiment (disambiguation), several units
 83rd Squadron (disambiguation), several units

Politics
83rd Delaware General Assembly, a meeting of the Delaware Senate and the Delaware House of Representatives
83rd United States Congress, a meeting of the United States Senate and the United States House of Representatives
List of United States senators in the 83rd Congress by seniority
Lindner Ethics Complaint of the 83rd Minnesota Legislative Session

See also
 83 (number)
 AD 83, the year 83 (LXXXIII) of the Julian calendar